The 1897–98 season was the third competitive season in Belgian football.

Overview
Only one official league existed at the time.  It was called Coupe de Championnat (Championship Cup) and was disputed between 5 teams as no new team was admitted.

No team was relegated this season since the FA decided to split the division into two leagues.  Four new teams were thus admitted at the end of the season and they formed one of the two leagues:  F.C. Brugeois (that had already played in the first competitive season), C.S. Brugeois, R.C. Gantois and F.C. Courtraisien.

Honour

League standings

External links
RSSSF archive - Final tables 1895-2002
Belgian clubs history

 
Seasons in Belgian football
1897–98 in European football by country